Hugo Christiaan Hamaker (23 March 1905 in Broek op Langedijk, North Holland – 7 September 1993 in Eindhoven) was a Dutch scientist, who was responsible for the Hamaker theory which explains the van der Waals forces between objects larger than molecules.  His 1937 paper was heavily cited.

He completed his doctorate at the Universiteit Utrecht in 1934. His dissertation was labelled:  Reflectivity and Emissivity of Tungsten; with a Description of a New Method to Determine the Total Reflectivity of Any Surface in a Simple and Accurate Way.  His adviser was Leonard Ornstein. From 1934 to 1967 he was employed in the Physical Laboratory of Philips in Eindhoven, and from 1960 to 1972 he was Professor at the Eindhoven University of Technology.

In 1959 he was elected as a Fellow of the American Statistical Association.

Publications
Hamaker published the following papers:
H.C. Hamaker (1934). Reflectivity and emissivity of tungsten : with a description of a new method to determine the total reflectivity of any surface in a simple and accurate way. Amsterdam: Noord-Hollandsche Uitg. Mij. x+76 pp. (PhD-thesis University of Utrecht)
 H.C. Hamaker and W.F. Beezhold (1934). Gebrauch einer Selen Sperrschicht Photo Zelle zur Messung sehr schwacher Intensit¨aten. Physica 1, 119-122.
 H.C. Hamaker (1937). The London-Van der Waals attraction between spherical particles. Physica 4(10), 1058–1072.
 H.C. Hamaker (1942). A simple and general extension of the three halves power law. Physica 9(1), 135–138.
 J.E. de Graaf and H.C. Hamaker (1942). The sorption of gases by barium. Physica 9(3), 297–309.
 H.C. Hamaker (1950). Current distribution in triodes neglecting space charge and initial velocities. Applied Scientific Research, Section B, 1(1), 77–104.
 H.C. Hamaker (1962). Applied statistics : an important phase in the development of experimental science (Inaugural lecture). Microelectronics and Reliability, 1(2), 101–109.
 H.C. Hamaker (1962). On multiple regression analyses. Statistica Neerlandica, 16(1), 31–56.
 H.C. Hamaker (1969). Nogmaals de wet en de kansspelen : commentaar op Hemelrijk's beschouwingen. Statistica Neerlandica, 23(3), 203–207.
 H.C. Hamaker (1968). Some applications of statistics in chemical and physical classroom experiments. In European Meeting on Statistics, Econometrics and Manag. Sci. (Amsterdam, The Netherlands, September 2–7, 1968).
 H.C. Hamaker (1969). De wet en de kansspelen. Statistica Neerlandica, 23(2), 179–191.
 H.C. Hamaker (1970). Over claimfrekwenties, claimbedragen en risicopremies bij de privé-autoverzekering. Het Verzekerings-archief, 47, 154–174.
 H.C. Hamaker (1971). New techniques of statistical teaching. Revue de l'Institut International de Statistique, 39(3), 351–360.

References
General
 
 Joan Keen Obituary: Hugo Christian Hamaker (1905-93) Journal of the Royal Statistical Society, Series A, Vol. 157, No. 3 (1994), pp. 500–501.
 Mysels & Scholten, HC Hamaker, more than an equation, Langmuir 1991, 7, 209-211
 

Specific

External links

1905 births
1993 deaths
People from Langedijk
20th-century Dutch physicists
Utrecht University alumni
Academic staff of the Eindhoven University of Technology
Fellows of the American Statistical Association